Izydor Szaraniewicz (1829, Kozarze –1901) was a Ukrainian historian.

Selected publications 
 Krótki opis geograficzny austryacko-węgierskiej monarchii (1875);
 Trzy opisy historyczne staroksiążęcego grodu Halicza w roku 1860, 1880 i 1882 (1883)

External links
  

1829 births
1901 deaths
Burials at Lychakiv Cemetery
19th-century Polish historians
Polish male non-fiction writers